The 2014–15 Aruban Division di Honor season is the 54th season of top-tier football in Aruba. It began on 10 October 2014. Britannia are the reigning champions, coming off their fourth league title in 10 years.

Teams
Caiquetio and Caravel were each relegated to Aruban Division Uno after finishing in ninth and 10th place, respectively, in last season's competition. Brazil Juniors and San Nicolas were each promoted from Division Uno.

Regular season

Play-offs

Final 

RCA wins the series.

References

External links
Soccerway

Aruban Division di Honor seasons
Aruba
foot
foot